Albert Augustus Carmichael (July 27, 1895 – June 4, 1952) was an American politician who served as the 14th Lieutenant Governor of Alabama from 1939 to 1943.

External links
Biography by the Alabama Department of Archives & History

Lieutenant Governors of Alabama
1895 births
1952 deaths
Alabama Democrats
20th-century American politicians